This is a list of top goalscorers in the women's Olympic water polo tournament since the inaugural official edition in 2000.

Abbreviations

Overall top goalscorers
As of 2016, eighteen female players have scored 20 or more goals at the Summer Olympics.

By confederation
Last updated: 1 April 2021.

By team
Last updated: 1 April 2021.

Most goals scored

One match

One tournament

The following table is pre-sorted by edition of the Olympics (in ascending order), name of the team (in ascending order), number of goals (in descending order), name of the player (in ascending order), respectively. Last updated: 12 August 2021.

Legend
 Team* – Host team

Source:
 Official Results Books (PDF): 2000 (pp. 96–101), 2004 (p. 53), 2008 (p. 54), 2012 (p. 345), 2016 (p. 193), 2020 (p. 234).

Top goalscorers in each tournament

All-time

The following table is pre-sorted by edition of the Olympics (in ascending order), name of the team (in ascending order), number of total goals (in descending order), name of the player (in ascending order), respectively. Last updated: 1 April 2021.

Legend
 Team* – Host team

Source:
 Official Results Books (PDF): 2000 (pp. 96–101), 2004 (p. 53), 2008 (p. 54), 2012 (p. 345), 2016 (p. 193).

Top goalscorers by team
The following tables are pre-sorted by number of total goals (in descending order), year of the last Olympic appearance (in ascending order), year of the first Olympic appearance (in ascending order), name of the player (in ascending order), respectively.

Legend
 Year* – As host team

Australia
 Women's national team: 
 Team appearances: 6 (2000*–2020)
 As host team: 2000*
* Number of goalscorers (40+ goals): 0
 Number of goalscorers (30–39 goals): 1
 Number of goalscorers (20–29 goals): 4
 Last updated: 1 April 2021.

Legend
  – Hosts

Source:
 Official Results Books (PDF): 2000 (p. 96), 2004 (pp. 56–57), 2008 (pp. 56–57), 2012 (pp. 347–348), 2016 (pp. 197–198).

Brazil
 Women's national team: 
 Team appearances: 1 (2016*)
 As host team: 2016*
 Number of goalscorers (40+ goals): 0
 Number of goalscorers (30–39 goals): 0
 Number of goalscorers (20–29 goals): 0
 Last updated: 1 April 2021.

Canada
 Women's national team: 
 Team appearances: 3 (2000–2004, 2020)
 As host team: —
* Number of goalscorers (40+ goals): 0
 Number of goalscorers (30–39 goals): 0
 Number of goalscorers (20–29 goals): 0
 Last updated: 1 April 2021.

China
 Women's national team: 
 Team appearances: 4 (2008*–2020)
 As host team: 2008*
* Number of goalscorers (40+ goals): 0
 Number of goalscorers (30–39 goals): 1
 Number of goalscorers (20–29 goals): 0
 Last updated: 1 April 2021.

Legend
  – Hosts

Source:
 Official Results Books (PDF): 2008 (pp. 59–60), 2012 (pp. 350–351), 2016 (pp. 203–204).

Great Britain
 Women's national team: 
 Team appearances: 1 (2012*)
 As host team: 2012*
 Number of goalscorers (40+ goals): 0
 Number of goalscorers (30–39 goals): 0
 Number of goalscorers (20–29 goals): 0
 Last updated: 1 April 2021.

Greece
 Women's national team: 
 Team appearances: 2 (2004*–2008)
 As host team: 2004*
* Number of goalscorers (40+ goals): 0
 Number of goalscorers (30–39 goals): 0
 Number of goalscorers (20–29 goals): 0
 Last updated: 1 April 2021.

Hungary
 Women's national team: 
 Team appearances: 5 (2004–2020)
 As host team: —
* Number of goalscorers (40+ goals): 0
 Number of goalscorers (30–39 goals): 0
 Number of goalscorers (20–29 goals): 3
 Last updated: 1 April 2021.

Source:
 Official Results Books (PDF): 2004 (pp. 68–69), 2008 (pp. 65–66), 2012 (pp. 359–360), 2016 (pp. 209–210).

Italy
 Women's national team: 
 Team appearances: 4 (2004–2016)
 As host team: —
* Number of goalscorers (40+ goals): 1
 Number of goalscorers (30–39 goals): 0
 Number of goalscorers (20–29 goals): 0
 Last updated: 1 April 2021.

Source:
 Official Results Books (PDF): 2004 (pp. 72–73), 2008 (pp. 68–69), 2012 (pp. 362–363), 2016 (pp. 212–213).

Japan
 Women's national team: 
 Team appearances: 1 (2020*)
 As host team: 2020*
 Number of goalscorers (40+ goals): 0
 Number of goalscorers (30–39 goals): 0
 Number of goalscorers (20–29 goals): 0
 Last updated: 26 July 2021.

Kazakhstan
 Women's national team: 
 Team appearances: 2 (2000–2004)
 As host team: —
 Number of goalscorers (40+ goals): 0
 Number of goalscorers (30–39 goals): 0
 Number of goalscorers (20–29 goals): 0
 Last updated: 1 April 2021.

Netherlands
 Women's national team: 
 Team appearances: 3 (2000, 2008, 2020)
 As host team: —
* Number of goalscorers (40+ goals): 0
 Number of goalscorers (30–39 goals): 0
 Number of goalscorers (20–29 goals): 1
 Last updated: 1 April 2021.

Source:
 Official Results Books (PDF): 2000 (p. 99), 2008 (pp. 71–72).

ROC
 Women's national team: 
 Team appearances: 1 (2020)
 As host team: —
 Related team: Russia
 Number of goalscorers (40+ goals): 0
 Number of goalscorers (30–39 goals): 1
 Number of goalscorers (20–29 goals): 2
 Last updated: 12 August 2021.

Source:
 Official Results Books (PDF): 2008 (pp. 74–75), 2012 (pp. 365–366), 2016 (pp. 215–216), 2020 (pp. 266–267).

Russia
 Women's national team: 
 Team appearances: 5 (2000–2016)
 As host team: —
 Related team: ROC
 Number of goalscorers (40+ goals): 0
 Number of goalscorers (30–39 goals): 1
 Number of goalscorers (20–29 goals): 0
 Last updated: 12 August 2021.

Source:
 Official Results Books (PDF): 2000 (p. 100), 2004 (pp. 80–81), 2008 (pp. 74–75), 2012 (pp. 365–366), 2016 (pp. 215–216).
Notes:
 Nadezhda Glyzina is listed in section ROC.
 Evgeniya Ivanova is listed in section ROC.
 Ekaterina Prokofyeva is listed in section ROC.

South Africa
 Women's national team: 
 Team appearances: 1 (2020)
 As host team: —
 Number of goalscorers (40+ goals): 0
 Number of goalscorers (30–39 goals): 0
 Number of goalscorers (20–29 goals): 0
 Last updated: 12 August 2021.

Spain
 Women's national team: 
 Team appearances: 3 (2012–2020)
 As host team: —
* Number of goalscorers (40+ goals): 0
 Number of goalscorers (30–39 goals): 1
 Number of goalscorers (20–29 goals): 4
 Last updated: 12 August 2021.

Source:
 Official Results Books (PDF): 2012 (pp. 353–354), 2016 (pp. 206–207), 2020 (pp. 251–252).

United States
 Women's national team: 
 Team appearances: 6 (2000–2020)
 As host team: —
* Number of goalscorers (40+ goals): 1
 Number of goalscorers (30–39 goals): 2
 Number of goalscorers (20–29 goals): 1
 Last updated: 12 August 2021.

Legend
  – Hosts

Source:
 Official Results Books (PDF): 2000 (p. 101), 2004 (pp. 84–85), 2008 (pp. 77–78), 2012 (pp. 368–369), 2016 (pp. 218–219), 2020 (pp. 273–274).

See also
 Water polo at the Summer Olympics

 Lists of Olympic water polo records and statistics
 List of men's Olympic water polo tournament records and statistics
 List of women's Olympic water polo tournament records and statistics
 List of Olympic champions in men's water polo
 List of Olympic champions in women's water polo
 National team appearances in the men's Olympic water polo tournament
 National team appearances in the women's Olympic water polo tournament
 List of players who have appeared in multiple men's Olympic water polo tournaments
 List of players who have appeared in multiple women's Olympic water polo tournaments
 List of Olympic medalists in water polo (men)
 List of Olympic medalists in water polo (women)
 List of men's Olympic water polo tournament top goalscorers
 List of men's Olympic water polo tournament goalkeepers
 List of women's Olympic water polo tournament goalkeepers
 List of Olympic venues in water polo

References

Sources

ISHOF

External links
 Olympic water polo – Official website

Top goalscorers, Women